W Coronae Borealis (W CrB) is a Mira-type long period variable star in the constellation Corona Borealis. Its apparent magnitude varies between 7.8 and 14.3 over a period of 238 days.

References

Corona Borealis
Mira variables
Coronae Borealis, W
M-type giants
146560
Emission-line stars